Haseley Manor may refer to:

 Haseley Manor (Isle of Wight)
 Haseley Manor (Warwickshire)